Toronto East, also known as East Toronto, was a provincial riding that was created in Toronto, Ontario when the country of Canada was established in 1867. At the time Toronto was divided into two ridings, East Toronto and West Toronto. In 1886, these ridings were dissolved and a combined riding of the entire city was created which elected three members. In 1894 this riding was split into four parts of which Toronto East was one. It occupied the eastern part of the old city of Toronto. From 1908 to 1914 it elected two members to the legislature. In 1914 the riding was abolished and reformed into two new ridings called Toronto Southeast and Riverdale.

Boundaries
In 1867, when the province of Ontario was established, two ridings were created to represent the city of Toronto. Toronto East was created from the city wards of St. Lawrence, St. Davids and St. James.

In 1886 the district was abolished and Toronto, a multi-member district covering the entire city, was created, which elected three members to the legislature.

The riding was re-formed in 1894. In the second incarnation, the boundaries were Lake Ontario to the south and Danforth Avenue to the north. The western boundary consisted of Sherbourne Street north to Carlton Street, east along Carlton to Sumach Street and north along Sumach to the Danforth. Its eastern border consisted of Coxwell Avenue north to Queen Street East, west along Queen to Greenwoods Avenue (now Greenwood Avenue) and north along Greenwoods to the Danforth.

In 1914, the riding was split between the new ridings of Toronto Southeast and Riverdale.

Members of Provincial Parliament

Election results

1867-1886

1894-1914

Seat A

Seat B

References

Notes

Citations

Former provincial electoral districts of Ontario
Provincial electoral districts of Toronto